Waisale Sukanaveita (born 19 July 1984) is a rugby league and union footballer who plays for the Terrigal Sharks. He is a Fijian international. In rugby league he plays as a hooker and in rugby union he is a utility back (halfback/center). In his earlier rugby league career he played for the Nadera Panthers. Then later representing the Fiji Bati side in the World Cup 2008 

Sukanaveita plied his trade in rugby union with French club Montauban. He was named in the Fiji 7s team for the Rugby World Cup 7s (rugby union) tournament being held in Dubai.

References

External links
Fiji v France: Teams

1984 births
Living people
Barrow Raiders players
Expatriate rugby union players in France
Fiji international rugby union players
Fiji national rugby league team players
Fijian expatriate rugby union players
Fijian expatriate sportspeople in France
Fijian rugby league players
Fijian rugby union players
I-Taukei Fijian people
Male rugby sevens players
Rugby league hookers
Rugby union centres
Rugby union scrum-halves
Sportspeople from Suva